A Woman Captured is a 2017 Hungarian documentary film directed by Bernadett Tuza-Ritter about a woman who is kept as a domestic slave in Europe. It was the first Hungarian feature-length documentary to compete at the Sundance Film Festival.

Overview
The film follows Marish, a 52-year-old woman in Hungary who is kept as a modern-day slave. She decides to escape the oppression and become free again.

Release and critical reception
A Woman Captured had its world premiere at the International Feature-Length Competition of the International Documentary Film Festival Amsterdam on 19 November 2017. Later it competed at Sundance, where it was nominated for Grand Jury Prize, and won the award for the Best Documentary at the Athens International Film Festival. The film was one of the five nominees for the 2018 European Film Award for Best Documentary.

See also
 List of films featuring slavery

References

External links
 
 
 

2017 films
2017 documentary films
Hungarian documentary films
Documentary films about slavery
2010s Hungarian-language films